Viviano Guida (born February 28, 1955 in Casorate Primo) is a retired Italian professional football player.

1955 births
Living people
Italian footballers
Serie A players
Inter Milan players
S.S.D. Varese Calcio players
Brescia Calcio players
A.C. Monza players
S.P.A.L. players
U.S. Catanzaro 1929 players
S.S. Juve Stabia managers
Association football defenders
S.S. Ischia Isolaverde players
Italian football managers